On 12 August 2007 one hundred thousand Muslims gathered in Indonesia to call for the return of the Caliphate. It was one of the largest political gatherings of Muslims ever to have taken place. The event was organised by the Islamist party, Hizb ut-Tahrir, whose stated intention is to create a new Caliphate encompassing the 'Muslim world'.

Key speakers, including Imran Waheed were refused entry to Jakarta and forced to deliver their speeches by video link.

Parallel conferences were also held in the UK and Palestine.

External links
Khilafah website

Political conferences
Hizb ut-Tahrir
2007 conferences
2000s in Islam